The Tua River is a tributary of the Purari River of Papua New Guinea. It originates in the Eastern Highlands Province and flows through the highlands of the Simbu Province, where it joins the Pio River, giving rise to the Purari.

Geography 
Tua River has several  tributaries, in particular Erave River, which in turn has Iaro River as its own  tributary.

History 
During the formation of the volcanoes of Soaru Range and Mount Karimui, the river's course was temporarily blocked, which caused the formation of a short-lived lake.

See also 
Tua River languages

References 

Rivers of Papua New Guinea